As Fast As, formerly known as Rocktopus, is an alternative rock/power pop band from Portland, Maine, USA which formed in 2001. The band was formed as Rocktopus and released two albums under that name before changing their name to As Fast As. 

The band consists of vocalist and keyboardist Spencer Albee (formerly of Rustic Overtones), bassist Haché Horchatta, guitarist Zach Jones and drummer Andrew Hodgkins.

Their first album, Open Letter to the Damned, was released on Octone Records in May 2006 and features the single "Florida Sunshine". The song was played on an episode of CSI: Miami, as well as in the promotional advertisements for the series. As Fast As left Octone Records due to "a difference in creative vision". On March 11, 2008, the band released Destroy the Plastique Man independently. The band stopped playing in August 2008, but despite Albee being busy with his new project Spencer and the School Spirit Mafia, the band reformed for a one-off concert at The Asylum in Portland on July 18, 2009, and released a new album, AFA For Effort, on June 23.

Discography

Albums

Singles

References

External links
 Official MySpace

Rock music groups from Maine
Musical groups from Portland, Maine
Musical groups established in 2003
Musical groups from Maine